The Hugh and Susie Goff House is a historic house located in Jerome, Idaho.

Description and history
The gable walls above the one story stone walls are covered with shingles. Roof covering is also shingles. The centered door has symmetrically placed one over one double hung sash on either side. Rough formed concrete lintels cap the windows and doors. The lug window sills are scooped out to emphasize their slope. The coursed rubble stone walls are composed small stones and have tight untooled joints.

This modest home, built , is a significant example of rural vernacular architecture and of the work of stonemason Marland Cox. It was listed on the National Register of Historic Places on September 8, 1983, as part of a group of structures in south central Idaho built from local "lava rock".

See also
 National Register of Historic Places listings in Jerome County, Idaho

References

External links
 * 

1921 establishments in Idaho
Houses completed in 1921
Houses in Jerome County, Idaho
Houses on the National Register of Historic Places in Idaho
National Register of Historic Places in Jerome County, Idaho